Uzzi is a given name. One derivation is biblical, from Uzzî meaning "my strength". The name can also be transliterated as Uzi. It may be a nickname for Uzza/Uzzah, Uzzia/Uzziah, and Uziel/Uzziel.

Biblical characters with this name:
 Uzzi, high priest of Israel ( in 1 Chr., Σαουια in Ezra), the son of Bukki, a descendant of Aaron (1 Chr. 6:5, 51; Ezra 7:4)

 Uzzi ben Sashai was the 3rd Samaritan High Priest according to Samaritan Genealogical Records. He may be identical to the Jewish High Priest, as his predecessor Bukki also may have been, although the patronyms imply different fathers which might be a product of an adoption or levirate marriage or being two different individuals

According to Samaritan tradition, Usi hid the tent sanctuary of the desert wandering ( Mishkan ) in a cave on the Garizim when the Israelites introduced the cult in Shilo , which was illegitimate from the Samaritan point of view .

 Uzzi,, a grandson of Issachar (1 Chr. 7:2, 3)
 Uzzi,, a son of Bela, and grandson of Benjamin (1 Chr. 7:7)
 Uzzi,, a Benjamite, a chief in the tribe (1 Chr. 9:8)
 Uzzi,, a son of Bani, had the oversight of the Levites after the return from captivity (Neh. 11:22)
 Uzzi,, the head of the house of Jedaiah, one of "the chief of the priests" (Neh. 12:19)
 Uzzi, a priest who assisted in the dedication of the walls of Jerusalem (Neh. 12:42)

Other people with this given name include:
 Alin Adrian "Uzzi" Demeter, Romanian Hip-Hop artist and member of B.U.G. Mafia
 Uzzi Ornan (1923–2022), Israeli linguist and social activist
 Uzzi Reiss (born 1945), American physician

See also 
 Uzi (disambiguation)

References

Attribution

High Priests of Israel
Samaritan high priests
Set index articles on Hebrew Bible people